Holland Historic District may refer to:

 Holland Historic District (Holland, Michigan), listed on the NRHP in Ottawa County, Michigan
Holland Downtown Historic District, Holland, Michigan, listed on the NRHP in Ottawa County, Michigan
Holland Patent Stone Churches Historic District, Holland Patent, New York, NRHP-listed
 Holland Historic District (Suffolk, Virginia), NRHP-listed